The  is an AC electric multiple unit (EMU) train type introduced in 1989 by East Japan Railway Company (JR East) on services in the Miyagi, Yamagata, and Fukushima areas of Japan.

Design
Built jointly by Nippon Sharyo and Tokyu Car, the type is based on the 415-1500 series EMU design, with all units formed as 2-car sets.

Variants
 719-0 series:  narrow-gauge type based at Sendai and Akita depots
 719-5000 series:  standard-gauge type based at Yamagata Depot
 719-700 series: FruiTea excursion set converted in 2015 from 719-0 series

, the fleet consists of 34 719-0 series two-car sets based at Sendai, two 719-0 series two-car sets based at Akita, and 12 719-5000 series two-car sets based at Yamagata.

719-0 series
The 719-0 series consists of  narrow-gauge two-car sets based at Sendai Depot for use on the Tohoku Main Line, Senzan Line, and Banetsu West Line, and at Akita Depot for use on the Ou Main Line. 42 sets were built by Tokyu Car Corporation between December 1989 and August 1991. The trains reused some equipment from withdrawn JNR-era EMUs, including the DT32 (motored) and TR69 (trailer) bogies, as well as the pantographs.

Some sets (H10 to H15) were reliveried in an "Akabe" colour scheme for Banetsu West Line services from 2007. One set, H27, was converted to become the 719-700 series FruiTea excursion train in 2015.

Sets H10 and H13 were transferred from Sendai to Akita in March 2017, entering revenue service on Akita area services on 28 July 2017. These sets were reliveried with a pink bodyline stripe to match the 701 series trains already used in the area.

Due to lacking of spare train components, the 719-0 series was gradually replaced by the E721-1000 series from 2017. As of March 2020, all sets were withdrawn from revenue services except sets H10, H13 and H27.

Formations
The 719-0 series sets are numbered H1 to H42, and are formed as follows, with one motored "Mc" car and one non-powered trailer ("Tc") car, and the KuHa 718 car at the southern end.

The KuMoHa 719 cars have one PS16 lozenge-type pantograph. Sets H10 to H18 have single-arm pantographs. The KuHa 718 cars have a toilet.

Interior

719-5000 series

The 719-5000 series consists of  standard-gauge two-car sets based at Yamagata Depot for use on the Ou Main Line. 12 sets were built between September and October 1991. These entered service from November 1991 on the regauged Ou Main Line, replacing the trains previously formed of 50 series coaches hauled by Class EF71 AC electric locomotives.

Formations
The 719-5000 series sets are numbered Y1 to Y12, and are formed as follows, with one motored "Mc" car and one non-powered trailer ("Tc") car, and the KuHa 718 car at the southern end.

The KuMoHa 719 cars have one PS104 single-arm pantograph. The KuHa 718 cars have a toilet.

Interior

719-700 series

In 2015, one 719-0 series set, H27, was converted to become the 719-700 series excursion train branded . This entered service from 25 April 2015, operating on the Banetsu West Line between Koriyama and Aizu-Wakamatsu. The train consists of a cafe car and seating car, with accommodation for 36 passengers.

Formation
The two car set is formed as follows. Car KuShi 718-701 was renumbered from former car number KuHa 718-27, and car KuMoHa 719-701 was renumbered from former KuMoHa 719-27.

Interior
Car KuShi 718-701 has a long curved bar counter and six bar stools. Car KuMoHa 719-701 has cafe-style seating with four- and two-person seating bays facing tables.

History
The first 719-0 series sets were delivered from Tokyu Car in Yokohama in December 1989. The 719-5000 series sets entered service from 5 November 1991 on the re-gauged Ou Main Line between Fukushima and Yamagata. The original pantographs on the 719-5000 series sets were replaced with single-arm pantographs in 2001.

Withdrawals commenced in 2016 with the entry into service of new E721-1000 series EMUs.

Fleet details
The fleet histories and build details are as follows.

719-0 series

719-5000 series

719-700 series

References

External links

 JR East 719 series 

Electric multiple units of Japan
East Japan Railway Company
Train-related introductions in 1989
Nippon Sharyo multiple units
Tokyu Car multiple units
20 kV AC multiple units